Dansenberg is a village and a Stadtteil (quarter) of Kaiserslautern in Rhineland-Palatinate, Germany.

Notable personalities 

 Zedd, a Russian-German record producer, DJ, multi-instrumentalist and songwriter, grew up here
 Dietmar Schwager, a German football coach and player, lived in Dansenberg until he died in 2018

References 

Villages in Rhineland-Palatinate
Kaiserslautern